Guido Andreozzi was the defending champion but chose not to defend his title.

Pablo Cuevas won the title after defeating João Domingues 7–5, 6–4 in the final.

Seeds
All seeds receive a bye into the second round.

Draw

Finals

Top half

Section 1

Section 2

Bottom half

Section 3

Section 4

References

External links
Main draw
Qualifying draw

Tunis Open - Singles
2019 Singles